Camden County Public Library may refer to:

Camden County Library, the county library system located in Camden County, New Jersey
Camden Public Library, the public library serving Camden, Maine
Camden County Public Library, a branch in the Three Rivers Regional Library System in Georgia